Unwell, a Midwestern Gothic Mystery is a horror podcast starring Clarisa Cherie Rios and produced by Hartlife NFP. The story follows Lillian Harper who has returned home to Mt. Absalom, Ohio to care for her injured mother. The podcast won a 2021 Audio Drama Award from the BBC.

Background 
The podcast began on February 19, 2019. The podcast consists of four seasons and over 75 episodes. The podcast is produced by Hartlife NFP. The show was inspired by Gravity Falls and House of Leaves. The premise of the show is that the protagonist, Lillian Harper, has returned home to her mother who owns an old boarding house in the Midwestern United States where strange things have been happening. Lily and her mother have been estranged for a long time, but her mother injured herself and needed someone to care for her while she recovered.

Reception 
Phoebe Lett wrote in The New York Times that the show might be horror but is also "goofy, romantic, funny or heart warming." Wil Williams commented on Polygon that the podcast uses silence to make the audience unsettled rather than jump scares. Scott Beggs wrote in Thrillist that the podcast "has the highest quality sound production." Toni Oisin wrote in Collider that the podcast is an "enticing and fresh listen." Digital Trends included the show on their best of 2022 list and said it had "impeccable audio and a quirky sense of humor." The podcast won a 2021 Audio Drama Award from BBC.

References

External links 

Audio podcasts
2019 podcast debuts
Horror podcasts
Scripted podcasts
Patreon creators
Ohio in fiction